The Silver Brumby series is a collection of fiction children's books by Australian author Elyne Mitchell. They recount the life and adventures of Thowra, a magnificent palomino brumby (Australian wild horse) stallion, and his descendants, and are set in the Snowy Mountains and southern regions of Australia.

Characters

Thowra: The Silver Brumby, Ghost Stallion. His cream coat, silvery mane and tail lead him to be hunted by man throughout his life.

Bel Bel: Thowra's cream coloured mother (she looks like Thowra, however, her coat is a little darker). She taught him all she knew of the high country and of the dangers of man.

Yarraman: Thowra's handsome flaxen chestnut father. The greatest stallion of the High country mountains and king of the Cascade Brumbies, until the Brolga takes over, and then, Thowra takes over.

The Brolga: The rival grey stallion. After battling Yarraman as a young stallion, he defeats and kills him when he reaches his prime. In turn, when Thowra reaches maturity, he defeats The Brolga, leaving him alive, and becomes king of the Cascade brumbies.

Boon Boon:The Brolga's daughter; joined Thowra's herd when she left her father's herd. She eventually became Thowra's mate. Boon Boon is the wisest mare Thowra has ever met.

Golden: A palomino mare who, born with humans, is bought by the man pursuing Thowra. Thowra is intrigued by the stunning mare and shows her how to jump the fence of man. With the help of Storm, Thowra makes Golden jump over a fence. She lives with Thowra through the winter and into the summer. Through the winter Golden is carrying Thowra's foal. Although she lives in the wild, Golden lacked the confidence to give birth to Thowra's daughter without the help of man. Later, Thowra returns, bringing Golden and their foal, Kunama, to the Hidden Valley.

Arrow:
Thowra’s older half brother(sired also by Yarraman) He is described to have Yarraman’s flaxen chestnut colouring but his mother’s cruel attitude and pinched looking face. 

Storm :
Thowra’s bay half brother, sired by Yarraman. Storm’s mother is Mirri

Mirri :
Storm’s mother, best friend to Bel Bel. She is described as a bay mare.

Kunama : The first daughter of Thowra and Golden. It means snow. She is beautiful and has joined Tambo's herd along with Jillimatong and Wanda, two other palomino mares.

The Silver Brumby

Bel Bel

A wise, creamy mare, mother of Thowra and good friends with Mirri, Storm's mother. Bel Bel runs with the stallion Yarraman, and in some cases is entrusted to go ahead and guide. Bel Bel, like Thowra, is scared of people, although in her case because she had always been hunted for her unusual colouration. She showed her son Thowra the ways of the hunted life, passing all her wisdom to him, which in turn Thowra passed down to his mare, Boon Boon, his daughter, Kunama, and his grandson, Baringa. He also tried to pass it down to his son, Lightning, and one of his favorite mares, Golden. Bel Bel is often described as a 'lone wolf' and dies on her own on the Ramshead Range, after one final chase. Bel Bel was the lead mare of Yarraman's herd.
She is described in The Silver Brumby's Daughter as an old creamy mare with dark points and great, wise eyes. This is a little puzzling, as at no other time are dark point mentioned. As such, she would be a buckskin or a dun. Thowra's colouration and progeny suggest that Bel Bel carried and passed on both dilute and dun genes to Thowra.

 No.1 Unknown Foal
 No.2 Unknown Foal
 No.3 Unknown Foal
 Thowra
 No.5 Chestnut Foal

Thowra

Thowra is a creamy-silver stallion, son of the chestnut stallion Yarraman and the creamy mare Bel Bel. Being born in a storm, his dam named him after the Aboriginal word for 'wind' not only for the gale outside when he was born, but because she was worried he would have to be as fast as the wind to remain free from the tyranny of man. The majority of brumbies in the southern areas of Australia being black, bay, brown and grey, the appearance of a cream horse causes quite a stir among wild herds and humans alike. Thowra is met with open hostility from other horses, stallions in particular, while the men of the mountains quickly become obsessed with trying to capture him for his rarity. To survive, Thowra is forced to become more cunning than both horse and man.

Though he is mentioned in nearly every Silver Brumby book, Thowra is only a main character in The Silver Brumby (and Silver Brumby Whirlwind), where he wins Golden for his mate, defeats the powerful stallion The Brolga, wins Boon Boon as his mate, and becomes King of the Cascade Brumbies. However, there is always the ever-present threat of man, and at the end of the first novel, Thowra is forced to pull off a seemingly suicidal trick to stay free.
There is some indication that he can shapeshift into a white hawk and a whirlwind. 
In the rest of the series, he is an ancestor of nearly all of the protagonists, and often helps them (and others) on their respective journeys.

Colouring

Due to the poetic license of the word ‘silver’ used to describe Thowra and his offspring it has misled some fans into believing that they are a pale grey or white, despite the fact they are described as ‘cream‘ or 'creamies' just as often. The reason why he is known as 'The Silver Brumby' is that during winter Thowra's cream coat is described as becoming much paler, and takes on an almost silver sheen. In combination with his silver mane and tail, Thowra's pale winter coat enables him to blend into the snowy landscape of his native mountains.
 
Though there is often much debate over the actual colour of the horses starring in the Silver Brumby novels, Thowra is almost most certainly a very pale palomino, or "isabella." The reference to him and his kin as being "creamies" as well as silver would help back this up. Isabella palominos can be extremely light and comparable to a true "cream" or off-white colour. In Australian horsemen's language, "creamy" is a word used to refer to a palomino of any of the mid to lighter shades of this dilution. The final clue is that a sire who is chestnut, combined with a palomino mother, is the perfect genetic recipe for palomino offspring since palomino is the presence of the cream gene over a chestnut base. Thowra would inherit the potential for chestnut from both his father and mother. And his mother would provide the one creme gene he would need to share her own colour. The fact that Yarraman is described as a light chestnut makes an "Isabella", (or pale palomino) foal even more likely. It could be argued that some of Thowra's own offspring with Golden (most certainly also a palomino) might be cremello (double-dilute creme and even more pale, with pink skin and blue eyes), but Thowra himself could only really be a palomino.

Other genealogical evidence from the books suggests that Thowra and the other "creamies", including his dam Bel Bel, daughter Kunama, son Lightning, and grandson Baringa are also palominos, rather than cremello, which is the next most likely colouring. In 'The Silver Brumby', the special relationship between Thowra and his mother Bel Bel is due to their unusual shared colouring: Bel Bel's other foals by the chestnut stallion Yarraman are all chestnut.

In the cartoon series and the movie released in the mid-1990s, the 'creamies' are represented as palominos, but earlier cover art shows the silver horses as greys (white) Original Cover Art. Despite the early representation of Thowra as a grey horse, there are several grey horses within the books, including Thowra's mate Boon Boon, and the grey stallion Cloud and his mate, which are considered as distinctly different in colour from the 'creamies'. The two mares which form the foundation for Baringa's herd in "Silver Brumby Kingdom", Dawn and Moon, are described as being a highly unusual colour which like the colour 'creamy' is distinguished from a grey horse, and is described simply as 'white'. These horses are likely to have been what is now called 'cremello' or possibly 'smoky cream', rather than 'dominant white', as they are both out of two grey parents (neither of their parents could, therefore, carry the dominant white gene). Their foals by the 'creamy' Baringa are described as 'creamies' ( a 50% likelihood of a mating between a palomino and a cremello horse). Though there are other ways for pure white foals to crop up, like a foal who is a grey, and 'greys out' early in life. Another possibility is maximum sabino or maximum tobiano.

Thowra is described as siring only three foals which are creamy like himself, these being an unnamed creamy foal upon the grey mare Boon Boon (which may have greyed out over a few years), and the true creamies the filly Kunama and colt Lightning from the creamy mare Golden. Golden is described as being a 'creamy' like Thowra himself, yet is much more clearly identified as being a palomino by her name, indicating that she is probably a darker, more traditionally 'golden' coloured palomino, though clearly still identifiable as being the same colour as Thowra.

In 'Silver Brumbies of the South', Thowra muses upon the fact that outside of these three foals, he had had no silver foals. Instead, 'he had got many creamies with dark points who rarely went free, for the men always hunted them, and he had got taffies, and some strangely handsome duns'. A 'creamy with dark points' would be a buckskin, whilst 'Taffy' is the Australian term for what is sometimes called 'chocolate silver', or a brown coat with pale silvery mane and tail. These foals might have inherited one copy of the cream dilution gene from their sire, and their base colour from their mothers but the unusual colours mentioned indicate that the 'silver' brumby carried other colour modifying genes in addition to the cream dilution gene, potentially including the silver dapple gene (which is dominant but is not expressed on chestnut-based coats and results in taffy), the bay gene, wild bay gene, seal brown gene (none of these three express on chestnut-based coats. They require at least one copy of the extension (black) gene to show) or the flaxen gene (a trait that is either recessive or polygenic which only expresses on chestnut-based coats. A flaxen palomino is indistinguishable from a non-flaxen palomino.)

Thowra's Herd
Boon Boon (daughter of The Brolga; Thowra's first mate)

Golden
Kunama (but once fully grown, joined Tambo's Herd)
Koora
Cirrus
Yuri
Wingilla (born from Boon Boon)
unnamed black mare
2 unnamed grey mares (daughters of The Brolga)
unnamed chestnut daughter of Arrow
Arrow's black mare
creamy colt with dark points (firstborn of Boon Boon)
2 unnamed dun foals
 Jillamatong 'Jilla' (creamy with dark points, born in Thowra's Cascade Herd)
 Wanga (creamy with dark points, born in Thowra's Cascade Herd)
 Yuri
 Dilkara
Many unnamed mares are also in his herd but are not mentioned in the story as they run separately with Storm's herd.

Silver Brumby's Daughter

Kunama

Thowra and Golden's daughter, Kunama, is a free-spirited and beautiful young filly, one of the first creamies begotten by Thowra. Her name means snow.
As a two-year-old, she is shown to possess a depth of intuition that is not shared by Thowra, her sire. This is perhaps partially because mares, without the luxury of a stallion's great strength and with the responsibility of foals at foot, must possess even greater wisdom than even the stallions of their herds if they are to remain free and wild. Kunama, having been trained in bush craft by both Thowra and Boon Boon, is cautious and wary of men, but not even this caution is enough to keep her in Thowra's Hidden Valley when her interest is captured by a young, spirited black stallion with an unusual splash of white on his flank, named Tambo, who is the son of a chestnut racehorse and another racehorse 'Highland Lass.' In the wild excitement of running with another young horse, Kunama does not heed the warnings of the wiser bush animals, and runs in the mountains for far longer than she should, even returning to the Cascades with Tambo during the summer, despite it being 'a time a silver filly must remain hidden or fear capture.' Eventually, a boy and his father manage to capture the silver filly, with the intention of turning her into a stock horse, but Kunama's longing for her freedom only succeeds in turning her into what the stock men call a bad horse. Kunama is eventually given her freedom by the boy out of pity, and she makes her way back to the Hidden Valley, remaining there with Tambo.

Kunama is full sister to Lighting and half-sister to Jillamatong and Wanga, both creamies but with dark freckles. She is dam to Baringa and an unnamed chestnut filly.

Silver Brumbies of the South-Silver Brumby Kingdom

Baringa

Nephew to Lightning and son of Kunama, Baringa is a true silver horse. Strong, swift and smart, he is truly Thowra's grandson.
But when Thowra takes him to the southern lands he is only a yearling. When he adds the beautiful Dawn to his herd, life becomes even more dangerous. However, Baringa soon finds a secret canyon where he can keep his herd, and he learns how to fight just as well as his grandsire. Eventually, he becomes the Silver Stallion of Quambat Flat.

Baringa's name means 'dawn' or 'light' in an Aboriginal language.
Baringa's story is told in the books "Silver Brumbies of the South" and "Silver Brumby Kingdom."
Baringa is also known to have the most beautiful herd anyone has seen in the south.

Baringa's Herd

Dawn: 'white and silver' filly
Moon: 'white and silver' filly
Yarolala: flaxen chestnut filly. Throwback to Yarraman. Daughter of Son Of Storm
Kalina: 'Cream and silver' colt. Baringa's first-born son. First foal of Dawn. Born during a great flood
An unnamed snow white filly foal by Moon
A blue roan filly, daughter of White-Face, who was also brought to Baringa by Thowra.
A lazy pert round white mare who belonged to the black stallion previously, she thinks everything is a joke (She also thought a big deal of herself, wanting Thowra to fight for her), brought to Baringa by Thowra.

Dawn
The first mare to join Baringa's herd, Lightning and Baringa first saw her dancing in a spiral of silver mist on Quambat Flat. Though Lightning tried many times to (unsuccessfully) win Dawn over, she decided to run with the more compassionate Baringa.
In the events of Silver Brumby Kingdom, Dawn is separated from the herd by a terrible flood and Baringa goes to search for her, eventually finding her on a small island in the middle of a river.
By this time she has borne Baringa's foal, whom they name Kalina.
Of interest is the fact that, though Baringa already has a herd, it is heavily implied in Silver Brumby Kingdom that Dawn is the mare he loves most, even to the extent of leaving his herd to search for her.
Dawn is Moon's half-sister, and the two seem to be great friends.

Moon
The second mare to join Baringa's herd; was called the 'hidden one'. She looks and has the same hoofprint as her half-sister Dawn. Moon originally followed The Ugly One. Her first foal was a snowy white filly.

Pert White Mare
One of the mares Thowra brought for Baringa. She was originally owned by the black stallion, but when Thowra decided to steal her, she went along willingly, yet slowly. She is described as 'lazy' and 'round'. Often called "Pert"
Thowra is embarrassed but enjoys her stubbornness and is often 'fun'.

Unnamed Blue Roan Mare
One of the mares Thowra brought for Baringa. When Thowra was looking for Baringa, she was the only one of her herd to tell him anything.

Kalina
Son of Dawn and Baringa, Kalina was born when Dawn was swept by the river onto a small island, and it took Baringa days to find her. Though Baringa originally wanted to name Kalina after the flood, Dawn believed that their foal shouldn't be called something so terrible, and they named him Kalina - "for the marvellous beauty of the frost on snow". He also sired Yuri's foal whilst they were searching for Thowra .

Koora
Thowra's mare whom he left to run with Baringa. Had a silver colt with pale roan ears, Dilkara.

Lightning

Son of Thowra and Golden and the full brother of Kunama. Lightning is one of the only three silver foals Thowra sires. After being hidden away in the Secret Valley for two years, he is taken south by Thowra, along with Baringa.
Lightning is beautiful but arrogant and is said by Thowra to have been almost as difficult as Golden to train in the way of the bush. He is captivated by Dawn's beauty and constantly pursues her for his herd. However it appears that Goonda is the mare he loves the most. When the black stallion comes looking for his stolen mares and becomes captivated by Goonda, Lightning learnt one thing. He learnt that even the remembered beauty of Dawn meant nothing to him compared with his feeling for Goonda.

Lightning finally concedes that he must not go after Baringa's mares when Baringa defeats the black stallion when he could not.

Lightning's Herd

Goonda: Red roan filly
unnamed colt born to Goonda
2 unnamed grey mares
2 blue roan mares (Stolen from the black stallion and won by Baringa who gifts them to Lightning)
Yarolala: Chestnut flaxen filly (who later joins Baringa's herd)
3 unnamed roan mares (Stolen and taken back by the black)

Goonda
Goonda is a beautiful red(chestnut/sorrel) roan mare and the first mare to join Lightning's herd when they were both two years old. She is the daughter of Whiteface. Lightning won her after his first real fight against another grey colt. Her name means fire. She grows into a lovely mare with Thowra surprised at how beautiful she's become and the black stallion stopping in his tracks when he saw her. She adores Lightning and when she sees him fight for her as though possessed by the spirit of Thowra, knows that she will belong to Lightning forever.

Yarolala
A chestnut flaxen filly whose colouring is a throwback to the Yarraman line. She is a daughter of Son of Storm.
Yarolala heeds Lightning's call with the intention of following Baringa but loses track of him as he melts into the bush before either she or Lightning realizes he's gone. She stays with Lightning's herd but spends most of her time wandering in search of Baringa who she considers to be 'the most beautiful horse in the mountains'.

Other books in the series

Moon Filly(1968)

The colt Wurring is devoted to the beautiful orphan filly Ilinga. But as she grows older and even more lovely, other stallions will challenge Wurring for her, including a mean iron grey stallion. Will the pair be separated?

Ilinga
One of the two protagonists of Moon Filly, Illinga is a strangely beautiful mare who is desperately trying to find Wurring (and vice versa) despite the efforts of an evil iron-grey stallion.

Colouring

The description of Yuri's coat colour is strange since she is described as being both a dark chestnut, and as having a coat that "glows" at night by reflecting the moonlight. This calls to mind the metallic coats of Akhal-Teke's, though this unusual metallic or "satin" sheen can occur in any horse breed. Champagne horses are also noted for this unusual sheen, though the occurrence of the rather new champagne colour in brumbies seems highly unlikely. It is heavily suggested by Elyne Mitchell that the "moon horses" are a special breed that is very refined and beautiful beyond their colour alone. Was she inspired by the rare Akhal-Teke? Or perhaps by Arabians? (a known influence on wild brumbies along with their descendants the Thoroughbreds.) Only the author herself would truly know that.

Yuri's sire Wurring also may carry this glowing metallic sheen since he is described as glowing like the sun itself.

Another horse whose coat colour is under debate is Ilinga. Although for the most part described to be a very dark brown, she is later (as she matures) described to have silver hairs running through her hair. Those with a better knowledge of horse genetics argue that she is much more likely a silver dapple black, (a black base with the silver dilution gene which dilutes black pigment to a paler, almost cream colour at times) because she is described with 'the colour of moonlight running across her back,' and strands of silver in her hair. This would certainly tie in better to explain the connection with the moon because of the colour contrast, and throughout the novels the colour of the character has been significant. But since silver dapples are described in some of the brumby novels, it seems strange that the author would not describe them as such. Another possible fault in this theory is that she does not seem to have been born silver dapple black, but rather turned this colour as she matured. Silver dapple horses are often born a buff or cream colour and with their first shed reveal their adult coat. 

All this confusion over colour could simply be an over-analysis on the part of enthusiastic brumby book fans. Perhaps Elyne Mitchell herself, though clearly very knowledgeable about horses, was taking creative license in describing the colours of her horses, without giving any regard to how likely they were or the possible genetics.

Silver Brumby books, in order of publication 
The Silver Brumby (1958) (paperback reprint)
Silver Brumby's Daughter (1960)
Silver Brumbies of the South (1965)
Silver Brumby Kingdom (1966)
Moon Filly (1968)
Silver Brumby Whirlwind (1973)
Son of the Whirlwind (1979)
Silver Brumby, Silver Dingo (1993)
Dancing Brumby (1995)
Brumbies of the Night (1996)
Dancing Brumby's Rainbow (1998)
The Thousandth Brumby (1999)
Brumby Stories (1999) (compilation)

Adaptations 

In 1993 the first book, The Silver Brumby, was adapted into a film of the same name. The film starred Russell Crowe, Caroline Goodall and Amiel Daemion. It was released as The Silver Stallion: King of the Wild in some countries.

The series was also adapted into a children's cartoon TV series of the same name in 1996. Running for 39 episodes, the series uses some character names, but at best is only a very loose adaptation of the books.

References

External links
Elyne Mitchell's Brumby books (This information source was recognized by the publisher HarperCollinsPublishers and was referred to in the afterword of the 2003 printing of The Silver Brumby)
Australian children's books
Novels set in Victoria (Australia)
Novels set in New South Wales
Novels about horses
Children's novels about animals
Series of children's books